Cherokee Dam is a hydroelectric dam located on the Holston River in Grainger County and Jefferson County, Tennessee, in the southeastern United States. The dam is operated and maintained by the Tennessee Valley Authority, which built the dam in the early 1940s to help meet urgent demands for energy at the outbreak of World War II. It has a generating capacity of 136 megawatts. The dam was named for the Cherokee, a Native American tribe that controlled much of East Tennessee when the first European settlers arrived in the mid-18th century.

Location
The dam was built immediately downstream from a point where Mossy Creek, which flows northeastward from Jefferson City, joins the Holston to create a T-shaped formation. The dam's immediate headwaters and tailwaters still resemble this formation.

The lake's Mossy Creek embayment reaches all the way to the city limits of Jefferson City. Tennessee State Route 92 crosses the Holston just downstream from the dam.

Background and construction

In 1940, with World War II raging across Europe, the United States government saw an urgent need to strengthen its military and defense infrastructure.  This required a massive expansion of aluminum production facilities, many of which were located in the Tennessee Valley.  To provide the necessary electricity, the Tennessee Valley Authority submitted a proposal for the construction of a new dam on the Holston River (the site— known as the "Mossy Creek site"— had already been selected and preliminary plans had been drawn up), the construction of a new coal plant (Watts Bar Fossil Plant, which operated 1942-1982) and for the expansion of the generating capacity of the existing Wilson and Pickwick Landing dams to Congress in July 1940 (the measure was later expanded to include construction of Douglas Dam, Fontana Dam, and several dams along the Hiwassee and Ocoee rivers).  Congress approved funds for the measure within a few days and President Franklin D. Roosevelt signed the measure into law on July 1, 1940.  Construction on Cherokee Dam began the following day.

The project also required the relocation of 875 families, 51 cemeteries, and a historical tavern at Bean Station (which was the only major community that was flooded). Fourteen new bridges were constructed and five existing bridges were raised above reservoir operating levels. As Congress eliminated a number bureaucratic obstacles regarding delivery of materials, construction proceeded at a smooth and rapid pace. On December 5, 1941, construction was completed, the gates were closed, and the reservoir began to fill. Power generation began on April 16, 1942, less than two years after the dam was first proposed.

Operation and output
Cherokee Dam is a gravity-type concrete spillway dam consisting of nine crest gates and eight sluice gates (the latter allowing reservoir control when water level is low). The combined capacity of the dam's four hydroelectric generators is 135,200 kilowatts. The dam lacks navigational locks, although its design allows them to be added if the necessity for them should arise.

While Cherokee's primary purpose is hydroelectric power production, like other TVA dams it also helps control flooding, which was rampant in the Tennessee Valley before the 1930s.  Numerous recreational areas exist along Cherokee Lake, including Panther Creek State Park, several smaller parks, and 20 public boat launches.  The Tennessee Wildlife Resources Agency regularly stocks the lake with walleye, crappie, and hybrid striped bass for recreational fishing.

As the arrival of Hurricane Florence approached, the TVA released water at Cherokee from its spill gates. These spill gates were used for the first time since 1994.

References

External links

Cherokee Reservoir — official TVA site
Cherokee Lake — Tennessee Wildlife Resources Agency Cherokee Lake information

Holston River
Tennessee Valley Authority dams
Dams in Tennessee
Hydroelectric power plants in Tennessee
Buildings and structures in Grainger County, Tennessee
Buildings and structures in Jefferson County, Tennessee
Dams completed in 1941
Energy infrastructure completed in 1941